Leopold Greenberg KC (21 March 1885 – 12 September 1964) was a South African judge who served as Judge President of the Transvaal Provincial Division of the Supreme Court of South Africa and Judge of Appeal.

Early life and education
Greenberg, who was Jewish, was born in Calvinia in the Cape Colony. He attended Grey College in Bloemfontein and in 1900 he relocated to Cape Town, to continue his studies at the South African College, where he obtained a BA (Hons.) degree. After graduating, he started working for a law firm in Johannesburg and studying part-time for his LLB degree, which he obtained in 1907.

Career
In May 1908, Greenberg was admitted to the Cape Town Bar, where he practised from 1909 to 1911. He was admitted to the Bar in Johannesburg in 1911 and took silk in 1924, and almost four months after taking silk he became a judge of the Transvaal Provincial Division of the Supreme Court. Greenberg was appointed Judge President of Transvaal Division in 1938 and five years later he was appointed an appellate judge, in which capacity he served until his retirement in March 1955.

Notable cases and awards
Greenberg was the presiding judge in the longdrawn-out trial of Daisy de Melker. After a trial that lasted thirty days, with sixty witnesses, he delivered an ex tempore judgment.

In 1954 the University of Cape Town conferred an honorary LLD upon him and in 1956 the University of the Witwatersrand, also honoured him with a LLD degree.

See also
List of Judges President of the Gauteng Division of the High Court of South Africa

References

1885 births
1964 deaths
South African Jews
South African judges
South African Queen's Counsel
Alumni of Grey College, Bloemfontein